Leucoptera oxyphyllella is a moth in the Lyonetiidae family. It is known from Kyushu island of Japan.

The wingspan is about 8 mm. Adults are on wing from the beginning of August and again from the beginning of May. There are two generations per year.

The larvae feed on Euonymus oxyphyllus. They mine the leaves of their host plant. The mine has the form of an upper surface digitate-blotch mine. It is pale green. The blackish grains of frass are arranged radially from the central patch. Pupation takes place outside of the mine in a white cocoon.

External links
Revisional Studies On The Family Lyonetiidae Of Japan (Lepidoptera)

oxyphyllella
Moths of Japan